Fengzhou or Feng Prefecture was a zhou (prefecture) in imperial China, centering on modern Feng County, Shaanxi, China. It was created in 554 by Western Wei and existed (intermittently) until 1374 during the Ming dynasty.

Geography
The administrative region of Feng Prefecture in the Tang dynasty is in the border area of modern southeastern Gansu and southwestern Shaanxi. It probably includes parts of modern: 
Under the administration of Baoji, Shaanxi:
Feng County
Under the administration of Longnan City, Gansu:
Hui County
Liangdang County

References
 

Prefectures of the Sui dynasty
Prefectures of the Tang dynasty
Prefectures of Former Shu
Prefectures of Later Shu
Prefectures of Later Tang
Prefectures of Later Zhou
Prefectures of Later Jin (Five Dynasties)
Prefectures of the Song dynasty
Prefectures of the Jin dynasty (1115–1234)
Prefectures of the Yuan dynasty
Prefectures of the Ming dynasty
Former prefectures in Shaanxi
Former prefectures in Gansu